The 2022 NATO virtual summit was a meeting of the heads of state and heads of government of NATO held virtually, on 25 February 2022. The meeting took place at the request of the Latvian and Estonian governments, following the 2022 Russian invasion of Ukraine, which had begun a day earlier. The request was pursuant to Article 4 of the North Atlantic Treaty, which requires consultations when "the territorial integrity, political independence or security of any of the parties is threatened."

At the summit, Secretary General Jens Stoltenberg announced that the alliance would be deploying extra land, sea and air units to member states in Eastern Europe from the NATO Response Force. This was the first time the response force had been deployed for collective defence.

Leaders of Member States participating in the videoconference

References 

2022 conferences
2022 in international relations
21st-century diplomatic conferences (NATO)
NATO summits